The Fresno Cardinals are a collegiate summer baseball team that will play in the South Division of the Far West League.  They are based out of Fresno, California, and will begin play in 2011 in the new league at John Euless Ballpark in Lodi.  They are a former member of the Pacific West Baseball League, which merged with the West Coast Tri-State League to form the new FWL.

References

External links
 Fresno Cardinals official website
 Far West League website

Amateur baseball teams in California